Ahoada West (also spelt Ahuda West) is a Local Government Area of Rivers State, Nigeria, located northwest of Port Harcourt. It was extracted in 1996 from the old Ahoada Local Government that makes up the present Orashi Region of Rivers State. Its seat is in the town of Akinima.

The Local Government Area comprises the Ekpeyes (Ubies and Ibuduyas), Engenni and Ogbogolo communities.
Thus there are three distinct languages namely Ekpeye, Engenni and Ogbogolo.

The Orashi river criss-crosses the entire Local Government area and its vegetation is mainly a high dense rain forest. Thus the occupations of the people are mainly farming, fishing, and hunting.

The Local Government Area is bounded by Ogba/Egbema/Ndoni Local Government Area, Abua/Odua Local Government Area, Ahoada East Local Government Area on the east we have Besini and Yenagoa both of Bayelsa State on the North and West respectively. The boundary between Rivers and Bayelsa states from the west is located at Engenni.

References 

Local Government Areas in Rivers State
1996 establishments in Nigeria
1990s establishments in Rivers State